Jaguwala is a town and Union Council of Kasur District in the Punjab province of Pakistan. It is part of Chunian Tehsil and is located at 30°58'0N 74°19'60E with an altitude of 180 metres (593 feet).

References

Kasur District